"The Wire" is the sixth episode of the first season of the HBO original series The Wire, the titular episode of the series. The episode was written by David Simon from a story by David Simon and Ed Burns and was directed by Ed Bianchi. It originally aired on July 7, 2002.

Plot summary

The street
Omar's boyfriend Brandon has been murdered. Wallace wakes up in his squatter apartment and goes through his routine of readying several children in his charge for school. The police arrive in the neighborhood and, as Poot and Wallace leave the house, they see Brandon's body. Across town, D'Angelo and Shardene discuss their blossoming relationship. D'Angelo crudely reveals that he believes that all women come with a cost, particularly his other girl Donette.

Wallace expresses his anguish at seeing Brandon's body. D'Angelo unsympathetically reminds Wallace that he knew what would happen to Brandon, and reminds him that killing is part of "the game" of drug dealing in Baltimore. Stringer tells D'Angelo they are bringing Bodie home following his recent arrests. At a court hearing, Levy lies to defend Bodie's actions, causing the judge to set him free on the condition that he makes regular phone calls to a probation officer. Herc and Carver later pick up Bodie, assuming he absconded from custody a second time, and are surprised that he managed to get released.

Avon, Stringer, and Stinkum visit the pit and deliver reward money to D'Angelo and Wallace for their part in finding Brandon; Avon also tells D'Angelo that Wee-Bey and Bird killed him. D'Angelo assures Stringer that there are no snitches in his crew. Avon tells D'Angelo that if he keeps working well, he will receive "points on the package" soon. D'Angelo, still withholding payment from the pit crew, finds his lookout, a girl named Cassandra, with groceries. She reveals she has been conspiring with Sterling to steal small amounts of drugs and sell them on the side. In order to protect them from punishment, he reassigns them elsewhere and tells nobody except Wallace.

With Johnny released from medical care, Bubbles returns to the streets. The pair runs a short con to steal copper pipes, which they sell to a contractor at "30 cents a foot" to make their next drug purchase. Bubbles and Johnny plan to steal the same copper pipes back from the site the contractor is working on.  When Johnny goes out to buy more drugs, he is arrested. Bubbles remarks upon Johnny's bad luck.

The police

McNulty meets with Rawls and Landsman. Rawls tells McNulty he expects the Barksdale investigation to wrap up in a week's time, which McNulty has no intention of doing. Pressured by Rawls, Landsman orders Bunk to charge the Barksdales in the old murder cases. McNulty, Greggs and Freamon expect issuing charges will prompt Avon to change his operation and negate all their work. Daniels fails to dissuade Rawls, but convinces Burrell to overrule him. Rawls responds by asking Santangelo to keep him informed of anything that McNulty does that might be used against him.

In the detail office, Freamon notes the high level of pager activity the previous night. The new wiretaps on the payphones legally require officers to monitor them; Herc is dismayed that this will mean long hours of surveillance work. Freamon is angry at his co-workers' laziness and asks what they expected when they joined the detail. After Stinkum chastises Bodie for using his name on the phone, Freamon explains to Prez that the call should be marked "pertinent" because it is evidence of conspiracy, even without providing hard evidence of drugs. Prez shows an aptitude and an interest in meticulously tracking the wiretaps, even asking an impressed Daniels if they can get additional filing cabinets.  Daniels berates Polk for stumbling in drunk and orders him to either get to work or check into medical for alcohol abuse. Polk chooses the latter.

McNulty meets with Vernon Holley and Ed Norris, the detectives working Brandon's murder, and discusses the potential link to the Barksdales. McNulty gets a call from Omar while minding his sons - he is forced to bring them along to the morgue with Omar. On seeing his lover's body, Omar screams, which the boys hear. Omar visits the detail, which has been able to tie Brandon's murder to the pager activity. McNulty is angry that they were unable to use the information, complaining that they are continually one step behind. Freamon and McNulty interview the arcade owner and Freamon matches the nearby payphone to the one used the night before. Omar offers to be a witness in the Gant case. The episode ends with the police photographs of Brandon's mutilated corpse on Daniels' desk.

Production

Title reference
The title repeats the show's own title, indicating that the series has truly begun, and refers to the wiretap devices used to monitor phone calls made by the Barksdale organization.

Epigraph

Freamon uses this phrase to describe the importance of the individual calls recorded by their wiretap device to Prez. Simon has also described it as referring to the need for the viewer to concentrate on all aspects of the show to follow the plot. Additionally, this can be connected to the continuing theme of the chess board used throughout the show, signifying that even the most insignificant people can change everything. The phrase was later used as the title of the program's official soundtrack, And All the Pieces Matter.

Credits

Starring cast
Although credited, Deirdre Lovejoy does not appear in this episode.

Guest stars

Music

This episode is one of the few in which the soundtrack features non-diegetic music. In a slow motion sequence (also a rarity) featuring Avon, Stringer and Stinkum in the low-rises, a piece called "Wax Box Music" by Florian Mosleh is played. Usually only season finales feature music not emanating from an on-screen source.

The selection playing during the final scene, where Daniels advises McNulty that he has managed to buy them some time, is 'Fleurette Africaine' performed by Duke Ellington, Charles Mingus and Max Roach, which appears on their album Money Jungle recorded in 1962.

First appearances
This episode marks the first appearance of homicide Detectives Ed Norris and Vernon Holley, seen investigating the death of Brandon.  Ed Norris is played by former Baltimore Police Commissioner Ed Norris; the character's personality is based on the real Norris, but his history is entirely different from his portrayer's.  According to Homicide: A Year on the Killing Streets, there was actually an African-American detective in the Baltimore Police Department homicide division named Vernon Holley.

Also seen for the first time is Sean McNulty, the oldest son of Jimmy and Elena McNulty.

References

External links
"The Wire" at HBO.com

The Wire (season 1) episodes
2002 American television episodes
Television episodes directed by Ed Bianchi
Television episodes written by David Simon